"Social Media Kings Into Queens" is the tenth episode of the tenth season of the American reality competition television series RuPaul's Drag Race, which aired on VH1 on May 24, 2018. The episode has contestants dress as butch men and promote a perfume called Trade for the mini challenge, and give a makeover to a social media personality for the main challenge. Miles Heizer and Lizzo serve as guest judges, alongside regular panelists RuPaul, Michelle Visage, and Ross Mathews.

Episode

Mini challenge
The six remaining queens are asked by RuPaul to appear in a commercial that promotes RuPaul's perfume for men, titled Trade. Each queen is to dress as butch men and deliver comedic improvisations, and Eureka wins.

Main challenge

As the winner of the mini challenge, Eureka is tasked by RuPaul to pair each contestant with six special guests for a make-over challenge. Aquaria gets paired with YouTube star Kingsley, Asia O'Hara and Raymond Braun, Eureka and Frankie Grande, Kameron Michaels and Anthony Padilla, Miz Cracker and Chester See, and Monét X Change with Tyler Oakley. Additionally, each pair took part in a home-made music video to RuPaul's song "Charisma Uniqueness Nerve and Talent".

RuPaul introduces the runway category, "Drag Family Resemblance". On the main stage, Asia and Eureka, alongside their drag daughters America O'Hara and Eufreaka, received positive reviews for their performances and make-overs, but were declared safe. Miz Cracker and her drag daughter Miz Cookie were commended for their performances, make-over, and chemistry, and were deemed the winners of the challenge. The bottom queens of the week were Aquaria, Kameron and Monet, who were criticized for not having a make-over resemblance to their drag daughters Capricia Corn, Kelly Michaels, and Short Change. Aquaria is declared safe, while Kameron and Monet lip-synced to "Good as Hell" by Lizzo. Kameron wins the lip-sync and Monet is eliminated from the competition.

Reception
In their review, Bowen Yang and Matt Rogers of Vulture.com rated the episode three out of five stars.

References

External links
 

2018 American television episodes
American LGBT-related television episodes
RuPaul's Drag Race episodes
Television episodes about social media